Ayub (Arabic: ايّوب Ayūb, commonly written ايوب) is the Arabic name of the Abrahamic prophet Job. Here it refers to the Islamic prophet which is mentioned in the Quran, see Job in Islam.

The spread of the name among Muslims is partly due to the fame of Saladin, founder of the Ayyubid dynasty, whose name in Arabic is Salạ̄hu d-Dīn Yūsuf ibn Ayūb.

Other people with this given name
 Abu Ayyub al-Ansari, a companion (sahaba) of Muhammad
 Ayub Ali (1919-1995), Bangladeshi Islamic scholar and educationist
 Ayub Ali Master (1880-1980), British-Bangladeshi social reformer, politician and entrepreneur
 Ayub Shah Durrani, Afghan ruler
 Ayub Khan (1907-1974), second President of Pakistan
 Ayub Afridi, Pakistani drug lord turned politician
 Ayub Ommaya (1930-2008), a Pakistani neurosurgeon
 Ayub Shah Bukhari, Pakistani Sufi
 Ayub Thakur (1948-2004), Kashmiri freedom activist
 Master Ayub, a Pakistani teacher who runs an open air, free of cost, school in Islamabad since 1986
 Ayub Khan Din (born 1961), British-Pakistani actor and writer
 Ayub Bachchu (1962-2018), Bangladeshi rock musician
 Ayub Khan (actor) (born 1969), Indian actor
 Ayub Daud (born 1990), Somali footballer
 Ayub Masika (born 1992), Kenyan footballer

Places
Ayub National Park

See also
 Eyüp (name), Turkish variant

Notes

Arabic masculine given names